No. 3 Control and Reporting Unit (3CRU) is a Royal Australian Air Force surveillance unit. 3CRU is currently headquartered at RAAF Base Williamtown near Newcastle, New South Wales and is primarily responsible for conducting surveillance of Australia's airspace and air battle management for RAAF flying squadrons. Operating from the Eastern Region Operations Centre, known commonly as EROC, 3CRU is the premier ADGE unit. A detachment of 3CRU, 3CRU DET TDL, operates from the Northern Region Operations Centre (NROC) at RAAF Base Tindal and currently operates the Vigilaire air defence system.

Military establishments in the Hunter Region
Port Stephens Council
3

Military units in Northern Territory